The 1935 Wyoming Cowboys football team was an American football team thatt represented the University of Wyoming as a member of the Rocky Mountain Conference (RMC) during the 1935 college football season.  In their third season under head coach Willard Witte, the Cowboys compiled a 4–4 record (3–4 against RMC opponents), finished in eighth place out of 12 teams in the RMC, and outscored opponents by a total of 76 to 59.

Schedule

References

Wyoming
Wyoming Cowboys football seasons
Wyoming Cowboys football